Wang Dan (born January 17, 1980) is an athlete from the People's Republic of China.  She competes in triathlon.

Wang competed at the first Olympic triathlon at the 2000 Summer Olympics.  She took thirty-second place with a total time of 2:08:49.10.

In the 2004 Summer Olympics, her rank diminished. From thirty-second to sixty-ninth, Wang dropped thirty-seven whole spots.

References
 sports-reference

1980 births
Living people
Chinese female triathletes
Triathletes at the 2000 Summer Olympics
Olympic triathletes of China
20th-century Chinese women
21st-century Chinese women